This is a list of the abbeys, priories, friaries and other monastic religious houses in Ireland.  

This article provides a gazetteer for the whole of Ireland.

Links to individual county lists

To navigate the listings on this page, use the map or the table of contents.  Alternatively, for listings which include the geographical coordinates and online references specific to the listed establishments, or if the entire listing is difficult to navigate, follow the links here (these links are also provided in the headings to each county in the main listing on this page):

Overview

Article layout
The list is presented alphabetically by County. Foundations are listed alphabetically within each county.

Communities/provenance: shows the status and communities existing at each establishment, together with such dates as have been established as well as the fate of the establishment after dissolution, and the current status of the site.

Formal Name or Dedication: shows the formal name of the establishment or the person in whose name the church is dedicated, where known.

Alternative Names: some of the establishments have had alternative names over the course of time. In order to assist in text-searching such alternatives in name or spelling have been provided.

In this article smaller establishments such as cells and notable monastic granges (particularly those with resident monks) and camerae of the military orders of monks (Templars and Hospitallers) are included. The numerous monastic hospitals per se are not included here unless at some time the foundation had, or was purported to have, the status or function of an abbey, priory, friary or preceptory/commandery.

Abbreviations and key

Locations with names in italics indicate probable duplication (misidentification with another location)or non-existent foundations (either erroneous reference or proposed foundation never implemented).

List of Houses by County

Northern Ireland

County Antrim

(For references and location detail see List of monastic houses in County Antrim [ edit])

Return to top of page

County Armagh
(For references and location detail see List of monastic houses in County Armagh [ edit])

Return to top of page

County Down
(For references and location detail see List of monastic houses in County Down [ edit])

Return to top of page

County Fermanagh
(For references and location detail see List of monastic houses in County Fermanagh [ edit])

Return to top of page

County Londonderry
(For references and location detail see List of monastic houses in County Londonderry [ edit])

Return to top of page

County Tyrone
(For references and location detail see List of monastic houses in County Tyrone [ edit])

Return to top of page

Republic of Ireland

County Carlow
(For references and location detail see List of monastic houses in County Carlow [ edit])

Return to top of page

County Cavan
(For references and location detail see List of monastic houses in County Cavan [ edit])

Return to top of page

County Clare
(For references and location detail see List of monastic houses in County Clare [ edit])

Return to top of page

County Cork
(For references and location detail see List of monastic houses in County Cork [ edit])

Return to top of page

County Donegal
(For references and location detail see List of monastic houses in County Donegal [ edit])

Return to top of page

County Dublin
(For references and location detail see List of monastic houses in County Dublin [ edit])

Return to top of page

County Galway
(For references and location detail see List of monastic houses in County Galway [ edit])

Return to top of page

County Kerry

(For references and location detail see List of monastic houses in County Kerry [ edit])

Return to top of page

County Kildare
(For references and location detail see List of monastic houses in County Kildare [ edit])

Return to top of page

County Kilkenny
(For references and location detail see List of monastic houses in County Kilkenny [ edit])

Return to top of page

County Laois
(For references and location detail see List of monastic houses in County Laois [ edit])

Return to top of page

County Leitrim
(For references and location detail see List of monastic houses in County Leitrim [ edit])

Return to top of page

County Limerick
(For references and location detail see List of monastic houses in County Limerick [ edit])

Return to top of page

County Longford
(For references and location detail see List of monastic houses in County Longford [ edit])

Return to top of page

County Louth

(For references and location detail see List of monastic houses in County Louth [ edit])

Return to top of page

County Mayo
(For references and location detail see List of monastic houses in County Mayo [ edit])

Return to top of page

County Meath

(For references and location detail see List of monastic houses in County Meath [ edit])

Return to top of page

County Monaghan

(For references and location detail see List of monastic houses in County Monaghan [ edit])

Return to top of page

County Offaly

(For references and location detail see List of monastic houses in County Offaly [ edit])

Return to top of page

County Roscommon

(For references and location detail see List of monastic houses in County Roscommon [ edit])

Return to top of page

County Sligo

(For references and location detail see List of monastic houses in County Sligo [ edit])

Return to top of page

County Tipperary

(For references and location detail see List of monastic houses in County Tipperary [ edit])

Return to top of page

County Waterford

(For references and location detail see List of monastic houses in County Waterford [ edit])

Return to top of page

County Westmeath

(For references and location detail see List of monastic houses in County Westmeath [ edit])

Return to top of page

County Wexford

(For references and location detail see List of monastic houses in County Wexford [ edit])

Return to top of page

County Wicklow

(For references and location detail see List of monastic houses in County Wicklow [ edit])

Return to top of page

Locations to be established

See also
List of abbeys and priories
List of monastic houses in Scotland
List of monastic houses in Wales
List of monastic houses in England
List of monastic houses on the Isle of Man
Dominicans in Ireland
List of Catholic churches in Ireland
List of cathedrals in Ireland
List of cathedrals in the United Kingdom
List of castles in the Republic of Ireland
List of castles in Northern Ireland

Notes

References

Sources
 
 Kathleen Hughes & Ann Hamlin The Modern Traveller to the Early Irish Church, Four Courts Press (1997). 

Monastic houses
Ireland, Republic